The 1985 U.S. Pro Tennis Championships, also known by its sponsored name Union Warren Bank U.S. Pro Tennis Championships, was a men's tennis tournament played on outdoor green clay courts at the Longwood Cricket Club in Chestnut Hill, Massachusetts in the United States. The event was part of the Super Series of the 1985 Nabisco Grand Prix circuit. It was the 58th edition of the tournament and was held from July8 through July 15, 1985. First-seeded Mats Wilander won the singles title and earned $35,700 first-prize money.

Finals

Singles
 Mats Wilander defeated  Martín Jaite 6–2, 6–4
 It was Wilander's second singles title of the year and the 18th of his career.

Doubles
 Libor Pimek /  Slobodan Živojinović defeated  Peter McNamara /  Paul McNamee 2–6, 6–4, 7–6(8–6)

References

External links
 ITF tournament details
 Longwood Cricket Club – list of U.S. Pro Champions

U.S. Pro Tennis Championships
U.S. Pro Championships
U.S. Pro Championships
U.S. Pro Championships
U.S. Pro Championships
Chestnut Hill, Massachusetts
Clay court tennis tournaments
History of Middlesex County, Massachusetts
Sports in Middlesex County, Massachusetts
Tennis tournaments in Massachusetts
Tourist attractions in Middlesex County, Massachusetts